The 2006–07 Slovak Superliga (known as the Slovak Corgoň Liga for sponsorship reasons) was the 14th season of first-tier football league in Slovakia, since its establishment in 1993. This season started on 14 July 2006 and ended on 30 May 2007. MFK Ružomberok were the defending champions.

Teams
A total of 12 teams was contested in the league, including 9 sides from the 2005–06 season and three promoted from the 2. Liga, due to the league's expansion.

Relegation for SK Matador Púchov to the 2006–07 1. Liga was confirmed on 27 May 2006. The one relegated team were replaced by MFK Košice, ŠK Slovan Bratislava and FC Senec.

Stadiums and locations

First stage

League table

Results

Championship group

League table

Results

Promotion/relegation group

League table

Results

Season statistics

Top scorers

Awards
Source:

Top Eleven

Goalkeeper:  Štefan Senecký (FC Nitra)
Defence:  Peter Pekarík,  Tomáš Hubočan,  Benjamin Vomáčka (all MŠK Žilina),  Marián Čišovský (Artmedia)
Midfield:  Igor Žofčák (Ružomberok),  Zdeno Štrba (MŠK Žilina),   Samuel Slovák (Slovan Bratislava),  Róbert Jež (MŠK Žilina)
Attack:  Tomáš Oravec (Artmedia),  Stanislav Šesták (MŠK Žilina)

Individual Awards

Manager of the season

 Pavel Vrba  (MŠK Žilina)

Referee of the Year

Ľuboš Micheľ

See also
2006–07 Slovak Cup
2006–07 Slovak First League

References

External links
RSSSF.org (Tables and statistics)

Slovak Super Liga seasons
Slovak
1